The Millionaire Recruit (Finnish: Miljonäärimonni) is a 1953 Finnish comedy film directed by Roland af Hällström and starring Lasse Pöysti, Sakari Halonen and Pentti Viljanen.

Cast
 Sakari Halonen as Recruit Miettunen  
 Heikki Heino as Captain Mänty  
 Mauri Jaakkola as Corporal  
 Eero Leväluoma as Lieutenant colonel 
 Airi Pihlajamaa as Captain Mänty's girlfriend 
 Lasse Pöysti as Vihuri  
 Elvi Saarnio as Miina  
 Heikki Savolainen as Mönkkö  
 Veikko Sorsakivi 
 Reino Valkama as General Peltomies  
 Toini Vartiainen as Toini  
 Pentti Viljanen as Sergeant Kulkunen  
 Kauko Vuorensola as Recruit

References

Bibliography 
 Qvist, Per Olov & von Bagh, Peter. Guide to the Cinema of Sweden and Finland. Greenwood Publishing Group, 2000.

External links 
 

1953 films
1953 comedy films
Finnish comedy films
1950s Finnish-language films
Films directed by Roland af Hällström
Finnish black-and-white films